The Adelaide Morning Chronicle was a newspaper published in Adelaide, South Australia during 1852 and 1853.

History 
While claiming not to be a religious newspaper, the Adelaide Morning Chronicle was established by the draper Andrew Murray during the South Australian Parliament's debate over separation of church and state. Its intention was to provide a voice for the influential and conservative Anglican section of the Adelaide community. This was in opposition to the opinions expressed by the non-conformist churches in their newspaper, the Austral Examiner.

The newspaper was of a sufficient quality to also be seen as competition to the South Australian Register. Murray later worked for the Melbourne Argus. The newspaper was reduced to a bi-weekly publication (rather than daily) after 35 issues in early 1852, through the economic effects of the Victorian gold rush and ceased in early 1853.

References

External links 
 
 Digitised page of Adelaide Morning Chronicle from State Library of South Australia's SA Memory website

Defunct newspapers published in Adelaide
1852 establishments in Australia
1853 disestablishments in Australia
Newspapers on Trove